The 1976–77 William & Mary Indians men's basketball team represented the College of William & Mary in intercollegiate basketball during the 1976–77 NCAA Division I men's basketball season. Under the third, and final, year of head coach George Balanis, the team finished the season 16–14 and 7–4 in the Southern Conference. This was the 72nd season of the collegiate basketball program at William & Mary, whose nickname is now the Tribe. This was William & Mary's final season in the Southern Conference before becoming an independent and eventually joining the Colonial Athletic Association.

The Indians finished in 4th place in the conference and qualified for the 1977 Southern Conference men's basketball tournament, where they lost to East Carolina in an opening round game on campus at William & Mary Hall.

Schedule

|-
!colspan=9 style="background:#006400; color:#FFD700;"| Regular season

|-
!colspan=9 style="background:#006400; color:#FFD700;"| 1977 Southern Conference Tournament

Source

References

William & Mary Tribe men's basketball seasons
William and Mary Indians
William and Mary Indians Men's Basketball Team
William